The Moscow Tournament was an international women's ice hockey tournament held from October 7–9, 1994 in Moscow, Russia. The tournament was won by Finland, which won all three games by at least 10 goals without giving up a goal the entire tournament.

Tournament

Results

Final Table

External links
Tournament on hockeyarchives.info

1994–95 in women's ice hockey
1994–95 in Russian ice hockey
1994–95 in Finnish ice hockey
Women's ice hockey tournaments